Jean-Paul Banos (born 27 January 1961) is a Canadian former fencer. He competed in the individual and team sabre events at four consecutive Olympic Games between 1984 and 1996. His brother, Jean-Marie Banos, also fenced for Canada at four Olympic Games.

Banos now coaches at HuaHua Fencing Club in Markham, Canada.

References

External links
 

1961 births
Living people
Canadian male fencers
Olympic fencers of Canada
Fencers at the 1984 Summer Olympics
Fencers at the 1988 Summer Olympics
Fencers at the 1992 Summer Olympics
Fencers at the 1996 Summer Olympics
Sportspeople from Ariège (department)
Pan American Games medalists in fencing
Pan American Games gold medalists for Canada
Pan American Games bronze medalists for Canada
Fencers at the 1983 Pan American Games
Medalists at the 1983 Pan American Games